Washuk District is a district in Balochistan province of Pakistan. Washuk, the district headquarters, is located at the center of the district.

Administration
Washuk District was once part of Kharan District in Balochistan province. It was declared a separate district in 2007, but its governance issues are largely managed by Kharan's district administration.

It is further subdivided into 3 Tehsils or subdistricts, 10 union councils and 216 mauzas (villages).

Geography
Washuk District is spread over 33,093 km2, of which only 71,520 hectares are arable. The rest consists mostly of barren desert and mountains of the Central Makran Range.

Demographics 
At the time of the 2017 census the district had a population of 175,712, of which 91,841 were males and 83,870 females. Rural population was 153,877 (87.57%) while the urban population was 21,835 (12.43%). The literacy rate was 23.86% - the male literacy rate was 30.56% while the female literacy rate was 16.75%. 68 people in the district were from religious minorities.

At the time of the 2017 census, 83.71% of the population spoke Balochi and 14.99% Brahui as their first language.

Education 
According to the Alif Ailaan Pakistan District Education Rankings 2014, Washuk is ranked 131 out of 146 districts in Pakistan in terms of the quality of education. For facilities and infrastructure, the district is ranked 132 out of 146.
A detailed picture of the district's education performance is also available online.

References

External links

 Washuk District

 
Districts of Pakistan
Districts of Balochistan, Pakistan